A tarp tent is a tarpaulin, a plastic or nylon sheet, used in place of a tent.  It is usually rigged with poles, tent pegs, and guy lines.  Ultralight backpackers use tarp tents because they are lightweight compared to other backpacking shelters.

In its simplest form it is floorless with open ends, as a fly or with the sides attached to the ground. It can also be set up as a loue with two adjacent sides by the ground and the opposite corner as highest point, giving more protection from wind and reflecting heat from an optional fire in front of the open side.

A tarp tent is commonly lighter and cheaper than a tent and easier to set up. However, because it is more open, it does not provide as much protection from rain, snow, wind, or cold as a tent does. It provides no protection from insects.

More sophisticated tarp tents are now manufactured or homemade with such things as bug screening and storm flaps on the ends and even floors and vents.  According to Harvey Manning in his book Backpacking One Step at a Time (The REI Press Seattle), "The term 'tarp-tent' as used here denotes a broad category which at one boundary is nothing more than a shaped tarp and at the other end verges on a 'true' tent. The common characteristic is a single wall, in most cases, waterproof."

In Mountaineering the Freedom of the Hills (4th ed. The Mountaineers, Seattle, WA) it says, "A tarp tent is both light in weight and low in cost, and offers adequate shelter from all but extreme weather in lowland forests and among subalpine trees."

Tarp tents are frequently made of silnylon material because it is lightweight, strong, and waterproof.

The  basha is essentially a tarp tent used by the British and Australian armies.

See also
Poncho tent

Notes

External links
Commercial manufacturer:
Vihe Vaellus (Finnish & English) 

Camping equipment
Tents